Sinamkol is a 2020 Tamil-language war drama film directed by Ranjith Joseph and starring Aravindhan. It is a Sri Lankan-Indian co-production.

Plot
Sinamkol is a compelling political story set eight years after the Sri Lankan Civil War.  It is a story of a Tamil Eelam soldier Amudhan, his incredible journey and tribunals, as he searches for his wife and daughter after being released from detention by the genocidal Sri Lankan regime.

The film describes the hardships of the lives of many Tamil soldiers in Sri Lanka. It portrays the political situations of the Tamils in their homeland through the eyes of Amudhan. Parallel to which, a Tamil family from diaspora visiting Tamil Eelam encounters troubles of post-war challenges. Sinamkol carries a powerful political message of post-war challenges faced by the minority Tamils.

Cast 
 Aravindhan 
 Narvini Dery Ravishangar
 Leelawathy
 Sinthar Athith
 Mathumathi
 Theepachelvan

Production  
The film is about the change that Jaffna has undergone in the past ten years. The film was shot in northern and eastern Sri Lanka. Other than three cast members, most of the cast are newcomers. The film was in the making for the past ten years. The film was shot in Jaffna and Mullaitivu. The film was shot in places affected by the Sri Lankan civil war. Much of the crew members are Sinhalese and the film was funded by Tamilians living abroad. The film is about a militant who is released from a Sinhalese controlled prison and returns to his motherland.

Awards and nominations

References

External links 

2020 films
2020s Tamil-language films
Indian war drama films
Indian films based on actual events
2020 drama films